The University of Washington Bothell (UW Bothell) is a branch campus of University of Washington in Bothell, Washington. It was founded in 1989 and is located just northwest of the junction of Interstate 405 and State Route 522, and it shares a campus with Cascadia College. UW Bothell was ranked by CNBC as No.1 "Pay off the most" public college in the nation in 2020.

History 
University of Washington Bothell was founded in 1989 when it was granted the approval of the Washington state legislature. The university began with a staff of 12 faculty members and a class of 143 students. Its first classes were held in fall 1990, and its first graduating class ⁠— of three students ⁠— completed their degrees in 1991. Dr. Warren Buck III was appointed the university's first chancellor in July 1999 and served until June 2005. Over the course of his chancellorship, he oversaw the university's transition into a four-year institution and the establishment of its permanent campus in 2000.

Academics
UW Bothell currently offers 33 undergraduate degrees, 21 undergraduate minors, and fifteen Master's degrees among five schools: 
 Business
 Interdisciplinary Arts and Sciences
 Science, Technology, Engineering and Mathematics (STEM)
 Educational Studies
 Nursing and Health Studies

Enrollment
UW Bothell enrolls nearly 6000 students in 55 undergraduate programs and graduate degree programs. UW Bothell began accepting freshmen in autumn 2006 and the first class to finish all four years at UW Bothell graduated in June 2010.

An agreement with the City of Bothell limits UW Bothell and Cascadia College enrollment. The enrollment limit is currently 10,000 FTE students. Initially, enrollment was limited to 3,000 FTE students until an entrance was built with direct access to State Route 522. The Washington State Department of Transportation completed this project in September 2009.

The overall undergraduate admission rate for 2020 was 74%, but admission to the university's Computer Science & Software Engineering (CSSE) program is highly competitive.

Wetland restoration project

UW Bothell is home to one of the largest wetland restoration projects on the West Coast, covering . Prior to the restoration of the wetlands, the land had been used for cattle grazing. Before this North Creek was straightened and confined to transport timber from upper areas of the watershed to sawmills located around Lake Washington. The complex ecological restoration project for the wetlands began in 1997 along with the construction of University of Washington Bothell and Cascadia College campus.  The goal of this project was to restore the area within the surrounding urban watershed into a sustainable and fully functional floodplain ecosystem. To manage and ensure forthcoming sustainability, great detail was given to essential theories of ecosystem science and ecological restoration in the design and implementation of the site. The hydrology was restored; drainage ditches and dikes were filled or removed. Small topographic variations were added to encourage environmental diversity and multiple plant communities. Between 1998 and 2002, over 100,000 plants were planted. Seven years after initial planting, the Wetland restoration project met its 10-year objectives.

The wetland is also an area for education. Over 30 courses from First-Year Programs, the School of Interdisciplinary Arts and Sciences, the School of Business, and the School of STEM (Science, Technology, Engineering and Math) have visited the restored wetland.

References

External links

 
Education in Bothell, Washington
Educational institutions established in 1990
University of Washington Bothell
1990 establishments in Washington (state)
University of Washington Bothell